Betty Mack Twarog (August 28, 1927 – February 6, 2013) was an American biochemist who was the first to find serotonin in mammalian brain.

Life and career 
Betty M Twarog was born on August 28, 1927, in New York City. She attended Swarthmore College from 1944 to 1948, focusing on mathematics. While studying for an M.Sc. at Tufts College she heard a lecture on mollusc muscle neurology and in 1949 enrolled under John Welsh in the PhD program at Harvard to study this area.
By 1952 she had submitted a paper showing that serotonin had a role as a neurotransmitter in mussels.

In autumn 1952 Twarog moved for family reasons to the Kent State University area, and chose the Cleveland Clinic
as a place to continue her study of her hypothesis that invertebrate neurotransmitters would also be found in mammals.
Although her supporter there, Irvine Page did not believe serotonin would be found in the brain, he nevertheless gave Twarog a laboratory and technician. By June 1953 a paper was submitted announcing the isolation of serotonin in mammalian brain.

Twarog left the Cleveland Clinic in 1954 and continued to work on invertebrate smooth muscle at Tufts, Harvard and SUNY at Stony Brook.
In later years,  at the Bigelow  Laboratory for Ocean Sciences in Boothbay Harbor, Maine, she worked on how shellfish evade phytoplankton poisons.

Twarog died on February 6, 2013, at the age of 85 in Damariscotta, Maine.

Impact in science and medicine
Twarog's isolation of serotonin in brain established its potential as a neurotransmitter and thus a modulator of brain action.
Her discovery was an essential precursor to the creation in 1978 of the antidepressant SSRI medicines such as fluoxetine and sertraline.

References

American women biochemists
Harvard University alumni
1927 births
2013 deaths
Swarthmore College alumni
People from Damariscotta, Maine
Tufts University School of Arts and Sciences alumni
21st-century American women